Manjinder Singh Sirsa (born 12 February 1972 as Manjinder Singh Riar) is an Indian politician and member of the Bharatiya Janata Party. Sirsa was a former member of the Delhi Legislative Assembly and represented the Rajouri Garden.

Political career 
He was the MLA of Rajouri Garden, New Delhi on BJP and Akali Dal seat in 2017 bypolls. He was also the President of Delhi Sikh Gurdwara Management Committee, elected first in 2013 and then again in 2017. Sirsa defeated outgoing president Paramjit Singh Sarna in the elections of 2013.

On 1 December 2021,he  resigned from Shiromani Akali Dal (SAD) citing personal grounds and joined BJP.

References 

People from New Delhi
Shiromani Akali Dal politicians
Members of the Delhi Legislative Assembly
Living people
1972 births
Delhi MLAs 2015–2020
Bharatiya Janata Party politicians from Delhi